Weston-McEwen High School is a public high school in Athena, Oregon, United States that is known for its pipe band.

History
Athena Weston School District was created in the 1970s with the merger of when the Athena and Weston school districts merged. Weston High School and McEwen High School were also merged, along with their respective mascots, the Tiger and the Scottie Dog, to form the new mascot, the "TigerScot".

Academics
In 2008, 84% of the school's seniors received their high school diploma. Of 43 students, 36 graduated, three dropped out, and four were still in high school the following year.

Pipe band
The Weston-McEwen Pipes, Drums, and Military Band began as a girls' pep band and highland dancing team in the early 1950s. A girls' pep band was organized at McEwen High School in Athena. Attempting to continue the community's Scottish heritage, six girls were selected annually as a highland dancing team. Called the "Highland Lassies", they performed the Highland Fling with the school band at sports events. In 1958, the group acquired a set of pipes. In 1972, the group was transformed into a full-fledged pipes and drums unit. In 1980, the first male players joined and the group's name was officially changed to the Weston-McEwen Pipes and Drums.

References

External links
 Weston-McEwen High School website

High schools in Umatilla County, Oregon
Public high schools in Oregon
1970s establishments in Oregon